Birdemic: Shock and Terror (often shortened to Birdemic) is a 2010 American independent romantic thriller-horror film written, directed, and executive produced by James Nguyen, and starring Alan Bagh and Whitney Moore. Inspired by Alfred Hitchcock's The Birds, Birdemic tells the story of a romance between the two main characters as their small town is attacked by birds. It also was inspired by the environmental documentary An Inconvenient Truth, which led to the film having an environmental message.

The film was largely self-financed and was produced through Nguyen's Moviehead Pictures company for a budget of $10,000. The film has gained notoriety for its poor quality, with many critics citing it as one of the worst films of all time. After a limited theatrical release, the film was picked up for distribution by Severin Films in 2010. A sequel, Birdemic 2: The Resurrection, was released in 2013. The sequel received even poorer reviews. A second sequel was released, titled Birdemic 3: Sea Eagle, which received even worse reviews.

Plot
Rod is a young software salesman living a successful life in Silicon Valley. He meets up with old classmate and aspiring fashion model Nathalie and begins dating her. Things go well for the couple, with Rod receiving a large bonus that he uses to start his own business, while Nathalie is chosen as a Victoria's Secret model. As they grow closer, the couple remains oblivious to signs of something going wrong around them, such as unexplained wildfires and the carcasses of diseased birds turning up on beaches.

After having a romantic time and kissing in a motel, Rod and Nathalie wake up to find that their town is under attack from eagles and vultures. The birds spit acid and explode into flames upon striking the ground (having become mutated and toxic due to global warming). Rod and Nathalie escape from the motel by joining up with an ex-Marine named Ramsey and his girlfriend Becky. As they leave town, they rescue two young children, Susan and Tony, whose parents have been killed by the birds.

The group proceeds to drive from one town to the next, fending off more bird attacks along the way and briefly meeting a scientist named Dr. Jones studying the phenomenon. Becky is killed by the birds. Ramsey tries to save a busload of tourists. As they leave the bus, Ramsey and the tourists are killed by acid that is dropped by the birds. Nathalie stops Rod from attempting to rescue Ramsey because she fears the birds will kill him, too.

Rod, Nathalie, and the kids continue to flee from the birds, driving into a forest where they briefly meet a "tree hugger" named Tom Hill, who talks to them about the dangers of global warming. After escaping a forest fire, the quartet ultimately settles on a small beach, where Rod fishes for dinner. As they prepare to eat, they are attacked by the birds, but then doves appear and all the birds leave in peace. The film ends as Rod, Nathalie and the kids watch the birds fly off into the horizon.

Cast

Production

Nguyen was inspired to write the script for Birdemic: Shock and Terror while spending time relaxing in Half Moon Bay, California. The majority of the film was shot in Half Moon Bay and the area surrounding the community. Birdemic began production in 2006 and took four years to produce, partly due to time limitations—filming was done mostly on weekends over the course of seven months—and also due to financial restraints, as it was financed through Nguyen's day job, plus the time it took for Nguyen to find a distributor.

The film was also inspired by Alfred Hitchcock's 1963 film The Birds. The Birds starred actress Tippi Hedren, who appeared in Nguyen's earlier film Julie and Jack. Birdemic includes footage of that appearance, playing on a television.

The film contains several anti-war statements. On the DVD commentary, the director explained that one early inspiration for the film was the anti-war film Apocalypse Now, and that at the end of the film the birds stopped their attack because they wanted to have peace and to give humans a second chance to help the environment. He said that as production continued, he became more influenced by Al Gore's film An Inconvenient Truth which is about global warming. The film was one of several in an uptick of bird horror films inspired by Hitchcock's film, beginning in 2007 with Kaw and continuing with Flu Bird Horror in 2008.

During the filming of Birdemic, Nguyen instructed star Whitney Moore not to socialize with her costar Alan Bagh after filming. On the commentary, Moore said they did not get permits to film at specific locations, instead just showing up, and sometimes getting kicked out. She said that at one point, they were filming on a public jogging trail, and Nguyen started yelling at joggers who were getting in the shot. Moore told him not to yell at people who were not associated with the film, and he responded by refusing to talk to her for three weeks. He gave her direction using her costar Bagh as an intermediary.

In a 2021 interview, Stephen Gustavson, who played the "treehugger" gives credence to the notion that permits were not obtained, mentioning that during the filming of his scene, Nguyen spotted a park ranger nearby and advised the cast and crew to pretend they were having a picnic.

The film was produced with a budget of $10,000, but the distributors have spent more on marketing than it cost to produce the film and purchase the rights. There were not many crew members on the film with the actors performing many of the roles that would normally be performed by crew members. They often held their own microphones, sometimes between their knees. Moore was in charge of the makeup after the first two makeup women quit. The film uses fake names for crew members in the credits, in order to appear more legitimate.

Promotion

In January 2009, Nguyen traveled to the Sundance Film Festival in Park City, Utah to promote the film freelance, handing out flyers to passers-by from his van, adorned with stuffed birds and paper signs that read "BIDEMIC.COM" (spelling Birdemic wrong in his haste) and "WHY DID THE EAGLES AND VULTURES ATTACKED ?", and renting out a local bar to screen the film. Word of mouth eventually gave Birdemic attention from horror movie websites Dread Central and Bloody Disgusting, while the trailer was featured on the July 30 episode of G4's Attack of the Show.

Release
On February 27, 2010, Birdemic received its Los Angeles premiere at the Silent Movie Theatre, sponsored by Bloody Disgusting and hosted by Tim Heidecker and Eric Wareheim, followed by a cast-and-crew attended screening at the Alamo Drafthouse in Austin, Texas on March 2, with follow-up screenings in Tempe, Arizona and New York City.

Severin Films acquired the film in early 2010 and launched the Birdemic Experience Tour 2010, which showed the film in numerous cities in the United States and Toronto, Canada from April through July 2010. Birdemic premiered in the United Kingdom at The Curzon Soho in London on May 28, 2010.

Home media
In early 2010, Birdemic was picked up by Severin Films with plans to release the film on home media. Birdemic was released on DVD and Blu-ray Disc on February 22, 2011. The DVD's special features include an audio commentary by James Nguyen as well as one by lead actors Alan Bagh, Whitney Moore, and fan who discovered the film, Bobby Hacker. The Blu-ray also features two deleted scenes, a feature on the Birdemic Experience Tour, and an episode of the public-access San Francisco TV show Movie Close Up which features Nguyen and was aired as Birdemic was still under production (the host of the show, Bonnie Steiger, later played an extra in the bus rescue scene of Birdemic). It is also available on demand at Amazon via Fandor and on the free streaming service Tubi.

Reception
Birdemic has been noted for its poor quality, with reviewers calling out its wooden acting and dialogue, amateurish sound and editing, nonsensical plot, and its special effects, consisting entirely of poorly rendered CGI eagles and vultures that, in addition to performing physically awkward aerial maneuvers (non-animated bird sprites in the background will simply rotate 360° in mid-air), spit acid and explode with unrealistic smoke upon impact with the ground with a plane dive sound effect. It has also been noted that the birds do not appear until nearly halfway (47 minutes) into the film.

On a 2009 "Best of" list, Bloody Disgusting listed Birdemic amongst its honorable mentions, calling it "the best worst film you'll see in 2010". The Huffington Post referred to the film as "truly, one of the worst films ever made." Variety reported that "'Birdemic' displays all the revered hallmarks of hilariously bad filmmaking: inane dialogue...miscued music, godawful sound...and special effects that simply must be seen to be believed: birds dive-bombing and exploding in red-and-yellow poofs of smoke, and clip-art eagles, crudely pasted on the screen, with only their wing tips mechanically flapping." The Village Voice described Birdemic as "one more in the pantheon of beloved trash-terpieces." Salon commented on the "atrocious CGI" and reported that the film had become "a cult hit among bad-movie fans."

An online review from the Independent Film Channel stated that the film feels "indebted to Wood's Plan 9 from Outer Space with its blend of ultra-low budget filmmaking and cuckoo bananas ecological message." The Guardian and The New York Times reported on the film's cult status, with The Guardian writing that "Birdemic features acting as wooden as a tree, clunky camera work...and crude special effects that reduce audiences to tears of laughter rather than terror." Slate wrote that "aspects of Birdemic can seem too bad to be true...The film's artlessness comes to function as its own sort of hallucinatory art...we see the narrative space of the film breaking down and rebuilding itself constantly—bloody stitches on its forehead, bolts in its neck. This breakdown can be profoundly discomfiting and surprisingly infectious." , the film holds an 18% approval rating on Rotten Tomatoes, based on 17 reviews with a weighted average rating of 2.55/10.

Tim Heidecker and Eric Wareheim, who hosted the Los Angeles premiere, parodied the movie on their television series Tim and Eric Awesome Show, Great Job! in the 2009 episode "Crows". On the February 25, 2011 episode of The Soup, scenes of Birdemic, especially an elongated scene in which employees clap incessantly at the company's good financial news, was the "Clip of the Week". The Bob Buel Ridicule Theatre podcast featured both Birdemic and its sequel on its show, mocking the films extensively. A live show of the podcast How Did This Get Made? released on February 28, 2012 and starring cast member Whitney Moore and guest star "Weird Al" Yankovic (who states that he is a fan of the film) is dedicated to discussing Birdemic.

A RiffTrax for Birdemic was released on February 22, 2011, featuring commentary by Michael J. Nelson, Bill Corbett, and Kevin Murphy of Mystery Science Theater 3000 fame. The release of their commentary was quickly followed up by recreations of seven humorous scenes from the film. On October 25, 2012, Fathom hosted a RiffTrax Live event featuring Birdemic. A physical DVD as well as a digital download of the show was released on November 25, 2014.

On August 4, 2016 an episode of Vice Media's filmmaker documentary series Outsider featured the history of film's production, discovery, and release, as well James Nguyen's future ambitions.

The film was also mentioned and had a scene shown on Ellentube by comedian Howie Mandel who jokingly asked if Martin Scorsese directed the film.

Sequel
A sequel, Birdemic 2: The Resurrection, which was also written and directed by James Nguyen, finished filming in March 2012, and was released in April 2013 with a special screening in Los Angeles followed by a tour to select theaters in the United States, and released online on April 16, 2013. The plot centers around a struggling Hollywood filmmaker named Bill (Thomas Favaloro), who casts an aspiring actress named Gloria (Chelsea Turnbo) in his upcoming film before eagles and vultures attack. Alan Bagh and Whitney Moore reprised their roles for the sequel, as did Colton Osborne, Rick Camp, Stephen Gustavson, Eric Swartz, Patsy van Ettinger, and Damien Carter.

In a 2016 Vice interview, Nguyen said that he was hoping to eventually make Birdemic 3: Sea Eagle, which would be his next instalment in the franchise. In October 2016, an Indiegogo campaign was raised in order to finance the third film of the series. The funding was eventually closed, with only roughly $596 out of the desired $500,000 raised. Despite this, it was announced in March 2021 that production on the third installment had begun, and is scheduled for release in late 2022. The poster for the film was released on November 9, 2021 on the Moviehead Pictures Twitter Page.

See also
 List of films considered the worst
 The Birds II: Land's End

References

External links
 
 
 
 Video documentary of the LA Premiere of Birdemic On February 27, 2010
 Rifftrax version on official YouTube channel

2000s romance films
American romantic horror films
Horror films about birds
Films set in 2008
Films set in California
Films shot in California
American natural horror films
Environmental films
Apocalyptic films
2010 horror films
2010 films
Climate change films
2010s English-language films
2000s English-language films
2000s American films
2010s American films